Keith Regier is an American politician, business owner, and retired teacher from Montana. Regier is a Republican member of Montana Senate for District 3. He served as a member of the Montana House of Representatives from 2007 to 2017.

Education 
Regier earned a Bachelor of Science degree in Education from University of Nebraska.

Career 
Regier was a teacher. As a businessman, Regier became the owner of Stillwater Sod.

In November 2008, Regier was elected to Montana House of Representatives District 5 which represents the Kalispell area.
 After the 2010 census he was reassigned to District 4. He was selected as the majority whip in the 2011 legislative session. Regier served as Majority Leader during the 2015-2016 session.

In 2016, he was elected to Senate District 3. The seat was vacated by Bruce Tutvedt due to term limits.

In 2021, Regier promoted a conspiracy theory that tiny tracking devices were being inserted into COVID-19 vaccine doses. During public debate in the Montana Senate, Regier stated, "I've read articles about putting a little chip in with the vaccine... what if that is federally approved and the employer requires that?"

Personal life 
Regier's wife is Jolene Regier. They have three children. Regier and his family live in Kalispell, Montana. Two of Regier's children, Amy Regier and Matt Regier, are Republican members of the Montana House of Representatives.

See also 
 Montana House of Representatives, District 4
 Montana House of Representatives, District 5

References

External links 
 Keith Regier at ballotpedia.org

Educators from Montana
Living people
Republican Party members of the Montana House of Representatives
University of Nebraska alumni
Politicians from Kalispell, Montana
People from Kalispell, Montana
1949 births
21st-century American politicians